Longshan Temple (Bangka Commercial Zone), formerly transliterated as Lungshan Temple Station until 2003, is a metro station in Taipei, Taiwan served by Taipei Metro. The station is named for the nearby Lungshan Temple.

Station overview

The two-level, underground station structure with an island platform and three exits. The washrooms are located inside the entrance area.

The station is located underneath Heping West Rd., between the intersections with Xiyuan Rd. and Kangding Rd.

The TRA Wanhua Station is within walking distance and approximately 150 meters south of the Metro station.

Station layout

Around the station
 Bangka Park (next to the station)
 Heritage and Culture Education Center of Taipei City (300m northeast of Exit 3)
 Huannan Market (1.3km southwest of Exit 1)
 Tangbu Cultural Park (650m southwest of Exit 2)

References

1999 establishments in Taiwan
Bannan line stations
Railway stations opened in 1999